A shiplift is a modern alternative for a slipway, a floating dry dock or a graving dry dock. A shiplift is used to dry dock and launch ships. It consists of a structural platform that is lifted and lowered exactly vertically, synchronously by a number of hoists. First, the platform is lowered underwater, then the ship is floated above the support, and finally the platform with support and ship is lifted and the ship is brought to the level of the quay.

Design

Nowadays, shiplift are most of the time supplied under rules of a classification authority. Lloyd's Register of Shipping is the authority with most experience in the certification or classification of shiplifts. Whereas "shiplift" is the word that is normally used, the term used by Lloyd's register is "Mechanical Lift Dock".

There are two different kinds of platform design, the articulated and the rigid. The articulated platform has hinged connections between the main and the longitudinal beams. A rigid platform, the beams are bolted or welded together.

The Syncrolift® System was invented by Raymond Pearlson, who was later awarded the Sperry Award for the invention, development and worldwide implementation of a new system for lifting ships out of the water for repair and for launching new ship construction..

It is important to synchronize the winches. Modern systems use electrical control and drive systems for the winches. Old fashioned electrically driven shiplift systems needed so much starting current that they often could only be used in the weekend when other electrical equipment was not in use. The modern shiplifts however do not have this disadvantage; they can start the movement in any desired curve.

The largest Shiplift in the USA is currently being built by Pearlson Shiplift Corporation for US Navy Vessels.

Transfer System
Many shiplifts use a transfer system for ships so that the vessels can be transported from the water to a parking place where they can be painted or repaired. One shiplift can serve many parking places, while a dry docking installation can only dock one ship.

For large vessels the transfer system consists of a number of trolleys or cradles, supported by high capacity steel wheels. The wheels drive on heavy duty rails. The transport can be one directional, but in order to serve more parking places, two directional systems are used. These two directional systems make use of a traverser carriage or sometimes the wheels of the trolleys can be turned over 90 degrees. Above the wheels often hydraulic cylinders are located so that the ship can be transported upon a so-called "Fluid Bed". The cylinders are also used to lower the ships on a static support, so that the transfer system with the active elements can be recovered.

Pleasure Craft
Smaller devices called "Boat lifts" are available that simply raise yachts, sailboats, or small watercraft above the water level at a dock for storage, for reduced maintenance cost and increased security. They can be operated by cables, by hydraulics, or by air flotation and some are "drive on" to segmented flexing supports.

Even smaller, are devices sometimes called "Portable boat lifts" which are easily transported cranes that allow one person to separate a boat from a trailer by themselves.

See also
Boat lift
Dry dock
Patent slip (1818 marine railway)
Slipway
Syncrolift
Travel lift

References

External links
www.shiplift.com 

Shipbuilding